Édouard Louis Dubufe (31 March 1819 – 11 August 1883) was a French portrait painter.

Biography

Dubufe was born in Paris. His father was the painter Claude Marie Paul Dubufe, who gave him his first art lessons. Later he studied with Paul Delaroche at the École des Beaux-arts. He was awarded the third-class medal at the "Salon des Artistes Français" in 1839.

In 1842, he married Juliette Zimmerman (the daughter of composer and pianist Pierre-Joseph-Guillaume Zimmerman) who was a sculptor. The composer Charles Gounod became Édouard's brother-in-law (and lifelong friend) when he married Juliette's sister Anna. During a stay in England, from 1848 to 1851, Dubufe discovered the great English portrait painters, who he would seek to emulate.

His official career as a portrait painter began in 1853 with portrayals of Emperor Napoléon III and the Empress Eugénie. That same year saw the birth of his son Guillaume, who would also become a well-known painter. In 1855, Juliette died in childbirth.

Dubufe continued to enjoy great success with the aristocracy, receiving a commission from the Emperor to paint the Congress of Paris in 1856. Later, the Empress asked for his assistance in decorating her "Salon Bleu" at the Tuileries Palace. In April 1866, the journal  ran an article by Émile Zola that criticized Dubufe's qualifications for acting as a judge at the Salon and suggested that he belonged to academic cliques that compromised his judgment.

That same year, Dubufe remarried. He died in Versailles in 1883 after a long illness.

References

Further reading 
 Emmanuel Bréon, Claude-Marie, Édouard et Guillaume Dubufe: Portraits d'un siècle d'élégance parisienne, Délégation à l'action artistique de la Ville de Paris, 1988

External links 

 
 ArtNet: More works by Dubufe
 

19th-century French painters
1820 births
1883 deaths
Burials at the Cemetery of Notre-Dame, Versailles
French male painters
Orientalist painters
19th-century French male artists